Lake Francis may refer to:

United States
Lake Francis, in Dobbins, Yuba County, California
Lake Francis (Murphy Dam), in Coös County, New Hampshire
Lake Francis (South Dakota), in Deuel County, South Dakota

See also
Francis Lake (disambiguation)
Lake Frances (disambiguation)
Frances Lake, in Yukon, Canada